Chockalingam is a surname of Tamil origin. Notable people with the surname include:

G. Chockalingam (died 2000), Indian politician
P. Chockalingam, Indian politician
T. Chockalingam, Assistant Professor, Department of Civi Engineering, Ramco Institute of Technology, Rajapalayam.
Mindy Kaling (born Vera Mindy Chockalingam in 1979), American actress, comedian, screenwriter, producer, director, and author

Indian surnames